Xyridacma veronicae, also known as the striped veronica moth,  is a moth of the  family Geometridae. It was described in 1934 by Louis Beethoven Prout.  It is endemic to New Zealand.

Taxonomy
This species was described by Louis Beethoven Pout as a replacement name for Xyridacma hemipteraria as discussed by Edward Meyrick in 1888.

References

External links

 Citizen science observations

Moths of New Zealand
Endemic fauna of New Zealand
Moths described in 1934
Oenochrominae
Endemic moths of New Zealand